The Irish League in season 1913–14 comprised 8 teams, and Linfield won the championship.

League standings

Results

References
 Northern Ireland - List of final tables (RSSSF)

1913-14
1913–14 in European association football leagues
Irish